Karolina Chlewińska (born 8 November 1983) is a Polish foil fencer, team silver medalist at the 2010 World Championships.

Chlewińska won a bronze medal at the 2003 Junior 	World Championships in Trapani. She competed in team foil at the 2008 Summer Olympics in Beijing, where the Polish team placed seventh.

References

External links
 Profile at the European Fencing Confederation

1983 births
Living people
Sportspeople from Gdynia
Polish female foil fencers
Fencers at the 2008 Summer Olympics
Fencers at the 2012 Summer Olympics
Olympic fencers of Poland
Universiade medalists in fencing
Universiade silver medalists for Poland
Medalists at the 2011 Summer Universiade
20th-century Polish people
21st-century Polish people